Interrogate were a Northern Irish heavy metal band from Castledawson, County Londonderry. Originally formed in the late 1990s, the band endured a near fatal accident, line-up changes and flammable practice rooms.

Their 2005 début EP Unbroken garnered the band a fan base, and cemented their place in the Irish metal scene. They played  support for GBH, Slit, Panic Cell and Raging Speedhorn.

Scarred for Life aimed to build upon Interrogate’s reputation as Northern Ireland's premier metal band, and with tour plans afoot for Ireland, mainland UK and beyond.

Band members
Darren Brown – vocals, bass
Stephen Brown – drums
Mark Johnston – guitar
Andy Campbell – vocals

Discography

EPs
 Unbroken (2005)

Studio albums
 Scarred for Life (2009)

References

External links
 Official website (archived)
 Interrogate on MySpace
 Scarred for Life album review

Heavy metal musical groups from Northern Ireland
Hard rock musical groups from Northern Ireland
Musical groups established in 1999
British metalcore musical groups
1999 establishments in Northern Ireland